George Martin (29 November 1875 – 14 May 1957) was an English cricketer who played for Hampshire.

Martin made his first-class debut for the team during the 1898 season, against a Derbyshire side who scored four centuries in the match, Martin scoring 3 runs from the tailend and taking a single wicket from 33 overs of bowling.

Martin appeared occasionally in the tailend until the end of the 1898 season, and in his final first-class game, in August 1899, scored 6 not out and 0 not out in the two innings in which he batted. This game also saw him take his best innings analysis of 3-64.

External links
George Martin at Cricket Archive 

1875 births
English cricketers
Hampshire cricketers
Year of death missing
Wiltshire cricketers